Rufus Adeyemo Adejugbe Aladesanmi III CON (born 1945) is a Yoruba Oba and the current Ewi of Ado Ekiti.

Reign 
Aladesanmi succeeded Adelabu I as the Ewi of Ado Ekiti in 1990.

He serves as the chancellor of Abubakar Tafawa Balewa University and was formerly the chancellor at the University of Jos.

In 2000 Aladesanmi was made a Commander of the Order of the Niger.

In 2018 Aladesanmi offered aid and support for Ayo Fayose, the Governor of Ekiti, after 400 members of the Government House were detained by police in a period of political turmoil. While laying the foundation of a new hall in Aladesanmi's official palace, Ibrahim Dankwambo, the Governor of Gombe State, also voiced support for Fayose and referred to him as the "symbol" of the People's Democratic Party. Aladesanmi and Fayose both spoke about the importance of peace and the rights of the people of Ado Ekiti in choosing their political leaders.

References 

1945 births
Living people
Rufus III
Commanders of the Order of the Niger
Nigerian traditional rulers
Yoruba monarchs
People from Ekiti State
Abubakar Tafawa Balewa University people
University of Jos people